Lactisole is the sodium salt and commonly supplied form of 2-(4-methoxyphenoxy)propionic acid, a natural carboxylic acid found in roasted coffee beans.   Like gymnemic acid, it has the property of masking sweet flavors and is used for this purpose in the food industry.

Chemistry 
Chemically, lactisole is a double ether of hydroquinone. Since it contains an asymmetric carbon atom the molecule is chiral, with the S enantiomer predominating in natural sources and being primarily responsible for the sweetness-masking effect. Commercial lactisole is a racemic mixture of the R and S forms.

Natural occurrences 
The parent acid of lactisole was discovered in 1989 in roasted Colombian arabica coffee beans in a concentration of 0.5 to 1.2 ppm.

Anti-sweet properties
At concentrations of 100–150 parts per million in food, lactisole largely suppresses the ability to perceive sweet tastes, both from sugar and from artificial sweeteners such as aspartame. A 12% sucrose solution was perceived like a 4% sucrose solution when lactisole was added. However, it is significantly less efficient than gymnemic acid with acesulfame potassium, sucrose, glucose and sodium saccharin. Research found also that it has no effect on the perception of bitterness, sourness and saltiness.  According to a recent study, lactisole acts on a sweet taste receptor heteromer of the TAS1R3 sweet protein receptor in humans, but not on its rodent counterpart.

As a food additive
The principal use of lactisole is in jellies, jams, and similar preserved fruit products containing large amounts of sugar.  In these products, by suppressing sugar's sweetness, it allows fruit flavors to come through.  In the United States, lactisole is designated as generally recognized as safe (GRAS) by the Flavor and Extract Manufacturers Association (Fema number: 3773) and approved for use in food as flavoring agent up to 150 ppm.  Currently, lactisole is manufactured and sold by Domino Sugar and its usage levels are between 50 and 150 ppm. In the European Union lactisole is allowed to be used as a flavouring substance in foods, FL No. 16.041.

See also 
 Gymnemic acid
 Hodulcine
 Ziziphin

References

External links 
 List of substances scheduled for evaluation or re-evaluation at the fifty-ninth meetingof the Joint FAO/WHO Expert Committee on Food Additives (JECFA). 2002
 EAFUS: A Food Additive Database

Taste modifiers
Food additives
Phenol ethers
Carboxylate esters
Organic sodium salts